Tom Kristensen (born 1967) is a Danish racing driver.

Tom Kristensen may also refer to:

 Tom Kristensen (author) (born 1955), Norwegian author
 Tom Kristensen (poet) (1893–1974), Danish poet, novelist, literary critic and journalist

See also
Tom Kristensson, Swedish rally driver